William Pickett may refer to:

 William Pickett (cricketer) (1805–1849), English cricketer
 William Pickett (alderman) (died 1796), English goldsmith and local politician, Lord Mayor of London in 1789
 William B. Pickett (born 1940), American historian

See also
 Bill Pickett (Willie M. Pickett, 1870–1932), cowboy, rodeo, Wild West show performer and actor
 Bill Pickett (lawyer), American lawyer
 Wilson Pickett (1941–2006), American singer and songwriter